Adnan al-Zurfi was chosen as the new prime minister-designate on 17 March 2020 by Iraqi President Barham Salih after Mohammad Allawi withdrew his nomination. Al-Zurfi withdrew from forming a new government on 9 April 2020. He was appointed by Paul Bremer, the Coalition Provisional Authority administrator, as governor of Najaf Governorate in July 2004.

As a result of his willingness to work with the Iraqi government and the coalition he and his family were targeted by insurgents and militias. His uncle was killed in April 2004, and his brother was kidnapped in Kufra on 1 December 2005, just prior to the 2009 governorate elections, in which Zurfi was running.

A member of the Bani Hassan tribe, al-Zurfi earned a degree in Islamic law at Alfik College, the Islamic jurisprudence college, in Najaf.

References

Governors of Najaf Governorate
Iraqi politicians
Living people
1966 births
People from Najaf